The Emir of Zazzau, known as Sarkin Zazzau in Hausa is the traditional ruler based in Zaria, which was also known as Zazzau in the past. Although in centuries past, the emirs ruled as absolute monarchs, in the 20th and 21st centuries Nigerian traditional rulers hold little constitutional power, but wield considerable behind-the-scenes influence on the government. The emir's residence is in the historic palace in the town of Zaria.

Shehu Idris was emir from 1975 until his death on September 20, 2020, at the age of 84. Idris was the longest reigning monarch in the history of the Zazzau emirate, having reigned for 45 years. During his reign in Zaria and envirous he considered peace over other things. He always create an atmosphere of peace with difference tribes that lives in Zaria. Alhaji Ahmed Nuhu Bamalli succeeded the late Emir.

The Kaduna State Government appointed Alhaji Ahmed Nuhu Bamalli as the 19th Emir of Zazzau on 7 October 2020.

He become the first emir from the Mallawa ruling house in 100 years, following the demise in 1920 of his grandfather, Emir Dan Sidi.

The Zazzau emirate is located in Zaria Local Government of Kaduna State. The emirate is old emirate that probably started in 15 century with the main tribes of Hausa and Fulani people.

History of Zazzau 
The Zazzau emirate traditionally started when king Gunguma founded it as one of the original of Hausa Bakwai with the function of capturing slaves from all other Hausa Barwar.

See also 
 Suleja Emirate

References

Zaria
Nigerian traditional rulers
1966 births
Living people